The 1922 Scottish Cup Final was played on 15 April 1922 at Hampden Park in Glasgow and was the final of the 44th staging of the Scottish Cup. Morton (as the Greenock club was named at the time) and Rangers contested the match, Morton won the match 1–0 with Jimmy Gourlay scoring the only goal of the game in the 12th minute.

The match was hard fought, with Morton defending aggressively. Rangers captain Andy Cunningham went off on 30 minutes with a fractured jaw and Rangers played the remainder of the game with ten men. Rangers had the bulk of play and missed a number of chances to score.

The victory was Morton's sole Scottish Cup win. For the 2021–22 season, the club issued a 100th anniversary commemorative 'throwback' home kit with a similar design and no sponsor.

Match details

Teams

See also
Played between the same teams:
1948 Scottish Cup Final
1963 Scottish League Cup Final

References

External links
SFA report
Scottish Cup Final, video footage from official Pathé News archive

1922
Cup Final
Scottish Cup Final 1922
Scottish Cup Final 1922
1920s in Glasgow
April 1922 sports events